Kay Hatcher is a Republican member of the Illinois House of Representatives, representing the 50th District since her election in 2008. She announced she will not seek re election in 2014.

From Yorkville, Illinois, Hatcher served of the Kendall County, Illinois Board. She also served on the Oswego School Board.

References

External links
Representative Kay Hatcher (R) 50th District at the Illinois General Assembly
By session: 98th, 97th, 96th
 
Kay Hatcher at Illinois House Republican Caucus

Year of birth missing (living people)
Living people
People from Yorkville, Illinois
Women state legislators in Illinois
School board members in Illinois
County board members in Illinois
Republican Party members of the Illinois House of Representatives
21st-century American women